Vasco Cantarello (born 8 April 1936) is an Italian rower. He competed in the men's eight event at the 1960 Summer Olympics.  He was a brother of Lorenzo Cantarello.

References

1936 births
Living people
Italian male rowers
Olympic rowers of Italy
Rowers at the 1960 Summer Olympics
Sportspeople from Padua